Data philanthropy describes a form of collaboration in which private sector companies share data for public benefit. There are multiple uses of data philanthropy being explored from humanitarian, corporate, human rights, and academic use. Since introducing the term in 2011, the United Nations Global Pulse has advocated for a global "data philanthropy movement".

Definition
A large amount of data collected from the Internet comes from user-generated content. This includes blogs, posts on social networks, and information submitted in forms. Besides user-generated data, corporations are also currently data mining data from consumers in order to understand customers, identify new markets, and make investment decisions. Kirkpatrick the Director at United Nations Global Pulse labels this data "massive passive data" or "data exhaust". Data philanthropy is the idea that something positive can come from this overload of data. Data philanthropy is defined as the private sector sharing this data in ways that the public can benefit. The term philanthropy helps to emphasis that data sharing is a positive act and that the shared data is a public good.

Challenges 
A challenge that comes with sharing data is the Internet privacy of the user whose data is being used. Mathematical techniques (differential privacy and space time boxes) have been introduced in order to make personal data accessible, while providing the users such data with anonymity. But even if these algorithms work there is always the possibility and fear of re-identification.
 
The other challenge is convincing corporations to share their data. The big data corporations collect provides them with market competitiveness. They are able to infer meaning regarding consumer behavior. The fear is that by sharing all their information, they may lose their competitive edge.

Further, numerous moral challenges are encountered. One proposal on how to solve those has been brought to light by Mariarosaria Taddeo in 2016, providing an ethical framework that aims to address those.

Sharing strategies 
The goal of data philanthropy is to create a global data commons where companies, governments, and individuals can contribute anonymous, aggregated datasets. The United Nations Global Pulse offers four different tactics that companies can use to share their data that preserve consumer anonymity.  These include:
 Share aggregated and derived data sets for analysis under nondisclosure agreements (NDA)
 Allow researchers to analyze data within the private company's own network, under NDA
 Real-Time Data Commons: data pooled and aggregated between multiple companies of the same industry to protect competitiveness
 Public/Private Alerting Network: companies mine data behind their own firewalls and share indicators

By providing these four tactics United Nations Global Pulse hopes to provide initiative and options for companies to share their data with the public.

Digital disease detection 
By using data gathered from social media, cell phones, and other communication modes health researchers have been able to track the spread of diseases.

In the United States HealthMap, a freely available website and mobile app software is using data philanthropy related tactics to track the outbreak of diseases. HealthMap analyzes data from publicly available media sources such as news websites, government alerts, and social media sites like Twitter for outbreaks of various illnesses around the world.  The creators of HealthMap have another website, Flu Near You, which allows users to report their own health status on a weekly basis. Traditional flu surveillance can take up to 2 weeks to confirm outbreaks. Doctors must wait for virological test to confirm the outbreak before reporting it to the Centers for Disease Control. This form of data philanthropy allows for up to date information regarding various health concerns by using publicly available information gathered from news outlets, government alerts, and social media sites. It is the data gathered on social media sites, where users are not aware their data is being mined that leads to HealthMap and Flue Near You being considered data philanthropy. 
 
The Centers for Disease Control and Prevention collaborated with Google and launched Google Flu Trends in 2008, a website that tracks flu-related searches and user location to track the spread of the flu. Users can visit the website to compare the amount of flu-related search activity against the reported numbers of flu outbreaks on a graphic map. The difficulty with this method of tracking is that Google searched are sometimes performed due to curiosity rather than because an individual is suffering from the flu. According to Ashley Fowlkes, an epidemiologist in the CDC Influenza division, "the Google Flu Trends system tries to account for that type of media bias by modeling search terms over time to see which ones remain stable". Google Flu Trends is not longer publishing current flu estimates on the public website. Visitors to the site can still view and download previous estimates. Current data can be shared with verified researchers.
 
A study by Harvard School of Public Health (HSPH) released in the October 12, 2012 issues of the journal Science discussed how phone data helped curb the spread of malaria in Kenya. The researchers mapped phone calls and texts made by 14,816,521 Kenyan mobile phone subscribers. When individuals left their primary living location the destination and length of journey was calculated. This data was then compared to a 2009 malaria prevalence map to estimate the disease's commonness in each location.  Combining all this information the researchers can estimate the probability of an individual carrying malaria and map the movement of the disease. This research can be used to track the spread of similar diseases.

Application in various fields
Through data philanthropy 'big data' corporations such as social networking sites, telecommunication companies, search engines amongst others, collect and make user generated information available to a data sharing system. This also permits institutions to give back to a beneficial cause. With the onset of technological advancements, sharing data on a global scale and an in-depth analysis of these data structures could alter the reaction towards certain occurrences, be it natural disasters, epidemics, worldwide economic problems and many other events. Some analyst have argued that this aggregated Information is beneficial for the common good and can lead to developments in research and data production in a range of varied fields.

Humanitarian aid
Calling patterns of mobile phone users can determine the socioeconomic standings of the populace which can be used to deduce "its access to housing, education, healthcare, and basic services such as water and electricity". Researchers from Columbia University and Karolinska Institute utilize information from mobile phone providers, in order to assist in the dispersal of resources by deducing the movement of those displaced by natural disasters. Big data can also provide information on looming disasters and can assist relief organizations in rapid response and locating displaced individuals. By analyzing certain patterns within this 'big data', could successively transform the response to destructive occurrences like natural disasters, outbreaks of diseases and global economic distress, by employing real-time information to achieve a comprehension of the welfare of individuals. Corporations utilize digital services, such as human sensor systems to detect and solve impending problems within communities. This is a strategy implemented by the private sector in order to protect its citizens by anonymously dispersing customer information to the public sector, whilst also ensuring the protection of their privacy.

Impoverished areas
Poverty still remains a worldwide issue with over 2.5 billion people currently impoverished. Accumulating accurate data has been a complex issue but developments in technology and utilising 'big data', is one solution for improving this situation. Statistics indicate the widespread use of mobile phones, even within impoverished communities. This availability could prove vital in gathering data on populations living in poverty. Additional data can be collected through Internet access, social media, utility payments and governmental statistics. Data-driven activities can lead to the cumulation of 'big data', which in turn can assist international non-governmental organization in documenting and evaluating the needs of underprivileged populations. Through data philanthropy, NGO's can distribute information whilst cooperating with governments and private companies.

Corporate
Data philanthropy incorporates aspects of social philanthropy by permitting  corporations to create profound impacts through the act of giving back by dispersing proprietary datasets. The public sector, is faced with an unequal and limited access to the frequency of data and they also produce, collect and preserve information, which has proven to be an essential asset. Company's track and analyze users online activities, so as to gain more insight into their needs in relation to new products and services.
These companies view the welfare of the population as a vital key to the expansion and progression of businesses by using their data to place a spotlight on the plight of global citizens. Experts in the private sector contend the importance of merging various data streams such as retail, mobile phone and social media data to create necessary solutions to handle global issues. Despite the inevitable risk of sharing private information, it works in a beneficial manner and serves the interest of the public. The digital revolution causes an extensive production of 'big data' that is user-generated and available on the web. Corporations accumulate information on customer preferences through the digital services they utilize and products they purchase, in order to gain a clear insight on their clientele and future market opportunities. However the rights of individuals concerning privacy and ownership of data are a controversial issue as governments and other institutions can use this collective data for other unethical purposes. Companies monitor and probe consumer online activities in order to better comprehend and develop tailored needs for their clientele and in turn increase their profits.

Academia
Data philanthropy plays an important role in academia. Researchers encounter countless obstacles whilst attempting to access data. This data is available to a limited number of researchers with sole access to restricted resources who are authorized to utilize this information; like social media streams enabling them to produce more knowledge and develop new studies. For example, Twitter markets access to its real-time APIs at exorbitant prices, which often surpasses the budgets of most researchers. 'Data Grants' is a trial program created by Twitter that provides a selective number of academics and researchers with access to real-time databases in order to garner more knowledge. They apply to gain entry into vast data downloads, on specific topics.

Human rights
Data philanthropy aids the human rights movement, by assisting in the dispersal of evidence for truth commissions and war crimes tribunals. Proponents of human rights accumulate data on abuse occurring within states, which is then used for scientific analysis and propels awareness and action. For example, non-profit organizations compile data from Human Rights monitors in war zones in order to assist the UN High Commissioner for Human Rights. It uncovers inconsistencies in the number of casualties of war, which in turn leads to international attention and exerts influence on discussions relating to global policy.

See also
 Big data
 Open data
 Freedom of information
 Data security
 Public-benefit corporation

References

External links 
 Data Philanthropy, where are we now? in UN Global Pulse blog by Adreas Pawelke and Anoush Rima Tatevossian (2013-05-08).
 TED Talk: Your Company's Data Could Help End World Hunger by Mallory Freeman, September 2016.
 DataKind

Big data
Data management